Shiv Nadar (born 14 July 1945) is an Indian billionaire industrialist and philanthropist. He is the founder and chairman emeritus of HCL Technologies and the Shiv Nadar Foundation. Nadar founded HCL in the mid-1970s and transformed the IT hardware company into an IT enterprise over the next three decades. In 2008, Nadar was awarded Padma Bhushan for his efforts in the IT industry. Nadar, nicknamed by friends as Magus (Old Persian for "wizard"), since the mid-1990s he has focused his efforts on developing the educational system of India through the Shiv Nadar Foundation.
According to Forbes, He is the 3rd richest person in India and the 56th richest person in the world with an estimated net worth of US$25.6 billion as of February 15, 2023.

Early life and education 

His parents were Sivasubramaniya Nadar and Vamasundari Devi. His mother, Vamasundari Devi, is the sister of S. P. Adithanar, founder of Dina Thanthi newspaper.

Nadar studied at Town Higher Secondary School, Kumbakonam. He also studied in the Elango Corporation Higher Secondary School, Madurai. He was admitted into the first form (Sixth Standard) in June 1955 and continued his education in Town High School until June 1957. Later, he joined St. Joseph Boys Higher Secondary School, Trichy, and completed high school education here. Nadar received a pre-university degree in the American College, Madurai and a degree in Electrical and Electronics Engineering from PSG College of Technology, Coimbatore.

Career 
Nadar began his career at Walchand group's Cooper Engineering Ltd. in Pune in 1967. he soon gave it up to begin his own venture, in partnerships with several friends and colleagues. These partners were Ajai Chowdhry (Ex-Chairman, HCL), Arjun Malhotra (CEO and chairman, Headstrong), Subhash Arora, Yogesh Vaidya, S. Raman, Mahendra Pratap and DS Puri.

The initial enterprise which Nadar and his partners began was Microcomp, a company which focused on selling teledigital calculators in the Indian market. HCL was founded in 1976, with an investment of Rs. 187,000.

In 1980, HCL ventured into the international market with the opening of Far East Computers in Singapore to sell IT hardware. The venture reported Rs 1 million revenue in the first year and continued to address the Singapore operations. Nadar remained the largest shareholder without retaining any management control.

In July 2020, Nadar handed over to his daughter Roshni Nadar, who became the first woman chair of a   listed Indian IT company.  In July 2021, Nadar also stepped down as managing director of HCL Technologies, and was succeeded by C Vijay Kumar, HCL Tech CEO, for a five-year term.

In October 2021, he was ranked by Forbes magazine as the third richest person in India with an estimated net worth of US$31 billion (Rs.2,36,600 Crores)

Focus on education 

In 1996, Nadar founded SSN College of Engineering in Chennai, Tamil Nadu in the name of his father, Sivasubramaniya Nadar. Nadar took an active role in the college activities, including the gifting of Rs. 10 lakh worth of HCL shares to the college. In 2006, Nadar announced that the college will promote research apart from ensuring that students benefit from foreign university tie-ups. Nadar joined the executive board of Indian School of Business in 2005. In March 2008, Nadar's SSN Trust announced the setting up of two Vidyagyan schools in Uttar Pradesh for rural students, where free scholarship for 200 students from 50 districts of the state. He visited Town Higher Secondary School in February 2011 and donated computers and other equipment worth Rs. 80 lakh. He served as chairman of the board of governors, Indian Institute of Technology Kharagpur (IIT Kharagpur or IIT-KGP), a technical institute until 2014.

Personal life
His only daughter Roshni Nadar is now chairwoman of HCL.

His wife Kiran Shiv Nadar is an Indian art collector and philanthropist.

Awards and accolades 

 In 2008, the Government of India awarded him with a Padma Bhushan, the third highest civilian award, for his contribution to the IT industry.
 In 2007, Madras University awarded him an honorary doctorate degree. 
 Shiv Nadar was awarded E&Y Entrepreneur of the Year 2007 (Services).
 In 2011, he was counted amongst Forbes 48 Heroes of Philanthropy in Asia Pacific. 
 In April 2017, India Today magazine ranked Nadar #16th in India's 50 most powerful people of 2017 list. 
 Shiv Nadar has committed more than $1 billion to philanthropy.

References

External links 
 
 Profile at HCL
 Profile at Forbes
 Profile at Bloomberg L.P.   
 

Living people
1945 births
Businesspeople in software
Indian chief executives
Indian billionaires
Tamil billionaires
Tamil entrepreneurs
Recipients of the Padma Bhushan in trade and industry
Tamil businesspeople
People from Thoothukudi district
20th-century Indian businesspeople
Businesspeople from Tamil Nadu
Indian Tamil people